HMS Al Rawdah was a ship of the Royal Navy. She was built in 1911 and originally christened Chenab for the Nourse Line of London.

In 1930 the ship was sold to Khedivial Mail Steamship & Graving Dock and renamed Ville De Beyrouth. In 1939 the ship was sold again and renamed Al Rawdah.

In 1940 the British Ministry of Shipping requisitioned the vessel and she was managed by the British-India Steam Navigation Company Ltd. In 1946 Al Rawdah was returned to her owners, and scrapped in 1953.

Internment 
Between 1940 and 1946 the vessel (described as a "hulk") was used as a military base and prison ship for Irish Republican internees and prisoners. Internment on the Al Rawdah began in 1939 as it was moored just off Killyleagh in Strangford Lough. Conditions on board the ageing ship were not good - food was described as "abominable" by survivors. Internees were packed in "bronchitic squalor" for months or years. On 18 November 1940 Irish Republican internee Jack Gaffney from Belfast died onboard the Al Rawdah. Some of the Irish detainees placed in the hold of Al Rawdah had also been interned on the British prison ship .

See also

References

External links 
 Info on Al Rawdah

Fleet auxiliaries of the United Kingdom
Defunct prisons in Northern Ireland
Prison ships
Auxiliary ships of the Royal Navy
1911 ships
Internment camps
Internment camps in the United Kingdom